Bay was a napped coarse woolen cloth, introduced to England by Dutch immigrants in the 16th century. It was produced in Essex at Colchester and Bocking, and also in various towns in the West of England. Production continued until the 19th century.

Colchester bays 
Colchester bays had a reputation for high quality in the 17th and 18th centuries.

Characteristics 
Bay was similar to baize but lighter in weight and with a shorter nap.  Bay was a plain weave fabric with worsted warp and woolen weft, although examination of a sample of Colchester bay surviving in 1903 revealed it to have a twill weave.

References 

Woven fabrics